I Can Hear Your Voice is a 2013 South Korean television series starring Lee Bo-young, Lee Jong-suk, Yoon Sang-hyun, and Lee Da-hee. It aired on SBS from June 5 to August 1, 2013, on Wednesdays and Thursdays at 21:55 for 18 episodes.

Originally set for 16 episodes, due to its successful ratings, the series was extended by 2 episodes.

Synopsis
After overcoming a difficult childhood, Jang Hye-sung (Lee Bo-young) becomes a public defender, but she is pragmatic, self-preserving, and jaded. Her life changes when she encounters Park Soo-ha (Lee Jong-suk), a high school senior with the supernatural ability to read other people's thoughts by looking into their eyes. Soo-ha gained his mind-reading ability when witnessing his father getting murdered ten years previously. His father's death had initially been dismissed as a car accident until Hye-sung, then a high school girl (Kim So-hyun), gave a decisive testimony in court despite the killer's threats (Jung Woong-in). Soo-ha has been searching for her ever since. As Hye-sung works with Soo-ha and a cop-turned-lawyer Gwan-woo (Yoon Sang-hyun), she gradually lets go of her pursuit of money and glory. Together, the unlikely team uses unconventional methods to solve their cases.

Cast

Main
 Lee Bo-young as Lawyer Jang Hye-sung
 Kim So-hyun as 15-year-old Hye-sung
Smart and hardworking, Hye-sung was raised by a poor but loving mother. After being falsely accused of causing an incident involving fireworks, she gets expelled from high school. She bravely testifies on the witness stand, causing the murderer of Park Soo-ha's father to be convicted and imprisoned. But both experiences change her, and ten years later, Hye-sung is an apathetic public defender who doesn't care about her clients and only does her job for the salary.

 Lee Jong-suk as Park Soo-ha
 Goo Seung-hyun as 9-year-old Soo-ha 
After witnessing his father killed (and almost getting killed himself), 9 year old Soo-ha gains the supernatural ability to read people's minds by looking at their eyes. When high school teenager Hye-sung testified in court to corroborate his testimony regarding the killer, he swore that he would always protect and guard her. He nurses a crush on her for a decade, but when he meets her again, he's dismayed to find her completely different from what he has expected.

 Yoon Sang-hyun as Cha Gwan-woo
A cop who brings his idealism, empathy and attention to detail to his new job as a public defender. Though outwardly geeky and meek, he has a keen intelligence that sees new angles in his cases.

 Lee Da-hee as Seo Do-yeon
 Jung Min-ah as 15-year-old Do-yeon
A prosecutor who comes from a rich, well-connected family, with her father being a judge and her mother a doctor. Do-yeon has always pushed herself to become the perfect daughter to please her parents. She was in rivalry with Hye-sung in high school and when a fireworks accident nearly caused her to lose her eyesight, she blames Hye-sung for it, despite the latter's denials. Do-yeon was also a witness to the murder of Park Soo-ha's father, but at the last minute, she loses her courage and doesn't testify.

Supporting
 Jung Woong-in as Min Joon-gook, the murderer of Soo-ha's father, with whom he had a grudge with. He was jailed for 10 years as a result of Hye-sung's testimony, which decisively led to him convicted of murder. He was currently released and bent on revenge against Hye-sung and Soo-ha for them getting him convicted of murder.
 Yoon Joo-sang as Lawyer Shin Sang-deok
 Choi Sung-joon as Choi Yoo-chang, clerk of the public defenders' office
 Kim Kwang-kyu as Judge Kim Gong-sook
 Kim Ga-eun as Go Sung-bin, Soo-ha's classmate
 Park Doo-shik as Kim Choong-ki, Soo-ha's classmate
 Kim Hae-sook as Eo Choon-shim, Hye-sung's mother
 Kim Byeong-ok as Hwang Dal-joong, Joon-gook's cellmate
 Jung Dong-hwan as Judge Seo Dae-seok, Do-yeon's father
 Lee Jung-hyuk as Lee Jung-hoon	
 Jang Hee-soo as Do-yeon's mother
 Jo Deok-hyeon as Park Joo-hyeok, Soo-ha's father
 Kim Soo-yeon as Moon Dong-hee, Sung-bin's classmate who is an upcoming entertainer
 Jang Hee-woong as Prosecutor Jo, nicknamed "Mr. Grass-like Hair"
 Kim Hye-yoon as Kim Yun-jin (Ep. 1)

Special appearances

Original soundtrack

Part 1

Part 2

Part 3

Part 4

Part 5

Ratings
In the table below, the blue numbers represent the lowest ratings and the red numbers represent the highest ratings.

Awards and nominations

Notes

References

External links
  
 
 

2013 South Korean television series debuts
2013 South Korean television series endings
Seoul Broadcasting System television dramas
Korean-language television shows
Television shows about telepathy
South Korean fantasy television series
South Korean legal television series
South Korean television series remade in other languages
Television shows written by Park Hye-ryun
Television series by Kim Jong-hak Production
Television series by Doremi Entertainment